Four ships of the Royal Navy have borne the name HMS Crocodile, after the large aquatic reptile, the crocodile:

  was a 24-gun sixth rate launched in 1781 and lost in 1784.
  was a 22-gun sixth rate launched in 1806 and broken up in 1816.
  was a 28-gun sixth rate launched in 1825. She was on harbour service from 1850 and was sold in 1861.
  was an iron screw troopship launched in 1867 and sold for breaking up in 1894.

Royal Navy ship names